Forbesganj is a neighbourhood in Forbesganj, Bihar, India.

Forbesganj may also refer to:
 Forbesganj town
 Forbesganj (community development block)
 Forbesganj subdivision 
 Forbesganj (Vidhan Sabha constituency)
 Forbesganj Airport
 Forbesganj police firing